José Diego may refer to:

 Diego José de Cádiz (1743–1801), a Spanish Capuchin friar and preacher from the Andalusia region.
 José de Diego (1866–1918), a Puerto Rican statesman, journalist, poet, lawyer, and advocate for independence.
 José Tormos Diego (1890–1977), a Puerto Rican politician who served as mayor of Ponce.
 José Diego (footballer), (born 1954), a Spanish former footballer who played as a midfielder for Real Sociedad and the Spain national team.

See also 
 Diego José, Argentine professional footballer.
 Diego José Abad, Jesuit poet and translator in New Spain and Italy.